Rondinelli da Silva Vieira (born 11 March 1999), commonly known as Rondinelli da Silva or simply Da Silva, is a Brazilian professional footballer who plays as a striker for Campeonato Brasileiro Série B club Ponte Preta.

Club career

Grêmio
Born in Rio de Janeiro, Brazil, Da Silva joined the Grêmio's Academy at the age of 16 in 2015.

Career statistics

Club

References

External links

1999 births
Living people
Brazilian footballers
Association football forwards
Grêmio Foot-Ball Porto Alegrense players
Sociedade Esportiva e Recreativa Caxias do Sul players
Campeonato Brasileiro Série A players
Footballers from Rio de Janeiro (city)